Dr. Dave Malucci is a fictional character on the NBC prime time drama ER.  He was portrayed by Erik Palladino.

Season 6 
Dave Malucci first appears as a second-year resident. He often breaks protocol to get things done and appears to lack warmth towards patients, but is occasionally shown to be both sensitive and insightful, particularly where younger patients are involved (a story in the episode "Loose Ends" very strongly implies that Malucci was physically and/or sexually abused when he was a child). He is also quite proactive and ready to pitch in or to take the lead on a problem. In "Last Rites," Malucci ropes John Carter into helping steal medical gear from an ambulance to go help some construction workers injured at a site not far from the hospital; later, Kerry Weaver reprimands them for violating emergency protocols and Carter comes away with a negative view of Malucci that he never really changes his mind about. Malucci attended medical school in Grenada, and in "Great Expectations," he uses his knowledge of the Caribbean to accurately diagnose a patient with a rare disease called Jamaican Vomiting Sickness because he recognized the symptoms from eating the area's akee fruit. In "Such Sweet Sorrow," Malucci allows Abby Lockhart to discharge a female patient without examining her personally. The patient later suffers an internal injury and nearly dies. After performing surgery to save the patient, Elizabeth Corday bluntly tells Malucci the staff considers him a sloppy, lazy physician and that "[none of us] think you're much of a doctor."

Although his sometimes incompetence and abrasive manner were the source of several dramatic events, he was most often used for comic relief due to his offbeat personality and tendency to get pranked, injured, or end up doing odd things like eating cereal out of an Emesis basin (with milk that, he didn't realize, was breast-pumped by Nurse Carol Hathaway). He and Jing-Mei "Deb" Chen had a somewhat-adversarial relationship that also hinted at possible signs of attraction between the two; Dave appeared visibly flustered when Deb walked into County's front desk to pick up files wearing a "nice" dress while he was trying to flirt with Abby. This got shunted aside once Dave found other staff members to annoy after his repeated flirtations were efficiently shut down (though he was never particularly upset) and Deb entered into a relationship with ICU Nurse Frank Bacon.

Season 7 
Malucci continues to clash with other staff members in Season 7. When Mark Greene discounts his view that a teenage patient is being mistreated by his father, Malucci (whose empathy toward victims of child abuse is a recurring theme, along with suggestions he was himself a victim) makes a snide remark about Greene's brain tumor, leading to friction between the two, though he does attend Mark and Elizabeth's wedding later in the season (along with two dates) and is quite pleased and kind about the birth of their daughter Ella, offering to buy Mark cigars to celebrate. In "The Visit,"  Peter Benton's nephew Jesse dies in the ER from gunshot wounds, and Malucci's accidentally callous, gang-related remarks provoke Benton into physically attacking him after he tries to apologize to Benton, though in the finale of the season Malucci is quick to intervene and protect Peter when Roger angrily storms into the hospital and assaults him, after Carla lied about him trying to have an affair with her. His attraction to Dr. Chen disappears without any explanation and no signs of it ever resurface. Their relationship is shown to be adversarial in a late season episode when an angry patient refuses to let Malucci examine her; when asked to take over, Chen lashes out at Malucci and refuses to help. The patient, a homeless former TV show host later recognized by Kerry Weaver, then sprays Malucci with Mace.

Season 8 
In "The Longer You Stay", Chen and Malucci attempt to treat a patient without compiling a complete medical history and fail to recognize his illness as Marfan syndrome, which Carter correctly diagnoses immediately after seeing the patient's chest X-ray, but too late to do anything. Malucci mistakenly assumes the patient is a drug user, and the procedure he and Chen perform proves to be fatal. Kerry Weaver, the on-duty attending physician during this incident, could not be reached because she had gone across the street to Doc Magoo's and left her pager in the restroom. When she returns and learns of Chen and Malucci's procedure, which required her authorization to be performed, instead of owning up to her losing her pager, she became enraged and tells Malucci that "in a perfect world, Dr. Malucci, I would never subject any patients to your care." Chen is ultimately forced to resign over the incident, though she later appeals the decision and returns.

In "Blood, Sugar, Sex, Magic", Malucci is caught having sex with a paramedic in an ambulance, giving a still-angry Weaver an excuse to recommend his dismissal, using him as a scapegoat to cover up for her own failure to supervise him and Chen, as Romano suggested to her earlier. Mark Greene attempts to convince Weaver that she cannot fire Malucci simply because she doesn't tolerate him, since by that criterion "You'd have to fire all of us!". Weaver cites several letters of reprimand and two failed rotations on file, promising that even if the hospital chooses not to terminate Malucci, she will ensure he never works in the ER again. In a last-ditch effort to save his job, Malucci reveals to Weaver that he "has a kid to support." Weaver wavers for a minute, but then repeats that he is fired. In retaliation, he bitterly tells Weaver that the only reason she wants to be in charge of the ER is because she has nothing and no one else in her life, and that nobody at the hospital likes her. He leaves after calling her a "Nazi dyke".

Malucci appears for the final time in "Never Say Never" when Weaver enters the doctor's lounge as he is cleaning out his locker. While removing his name tag, he and Weaver have a silent moment of mutual enmity. He then leaves the lounge and County, never to be seen again.

Malucci was the first of four characters to leave in season 8. He is mentioned in the episode "Brothers and Sisters", when Dr. Carter tells young resident Michael Gallant that Malucci was reckless and "killed a patient". This would be the last time Malucci would be acknowledged by any of the characters on the show.

Season 15 

During the 15th and final season of ER, at the end of the episode "The Book of Abby", long-serving nurse Haleh Adams shows the departing Abby Lockhart a closet wall where all the past doctors and employees have put their locker name tags before leaving County for good. Amongst them, the tag "Malucci" can be seen. Some fans of the show singled out Malucci's inclusion on the wall as a less plausible part of this scene, because his departure took place on such bad terms few at the hospital liked him at the time he was fired by Weaver (though Greene and Chen did express some sympathy for him and his situation).

References

 https://web.archive.org/web/20080913222618/http://www.tnt.tv/stories/story/?oid=571

External links
 Bio at TNT.com
 Official ER website at NBC.com

ER (TV series) characters
Television characters introduced in 1999
Fictional physicians